Dmitry Georgievich Dmitriev (born 3 March 1956) is a Russian male former long-distance runner who competed for the Soviet Union. He competed in the 5000 metres at the 1983 World Championships in Athletics and placed fourth after pushing the pace near the end. He also competed at the European Athletics Championships in 1982, finishing eleventh. He was a 5000 m silver medallist at the Friendship Games in 1984 and 1983 European Cup. His highest global ranking was third in the 3000 metres in the 1984 season.

Born in Leningrad, he became involved in athletics at a young age. He subsequently went on to study sport at the Military Institute of Physical Culture. His first international success came at the 1975 European Athletics Junior Championships, where he was runner-up to Finland's Ari Paunonen in the 1500 metres. He was a five-time national champion at the Soviet Athletics Championships, winning a 1500 metres/5000 m double in 1980 before extending his 5000 m title to four consecutive victories. His winning time of 13:19.18 minutes in 1982 was the fastest ever recorded at the competition. On the national circuit, he was twice winner of the 5000 m at the Znamensky Memorial, placing first in 1982 and 1983.

International competitions

National titles
Soviet Athletics Championships
1500 m: 1980
5000 m: 1980, 1981, 1982, 1983

Personal bests
 1500 metres – 3:36.50 min (1984)
 3000 metres – 7:42.05 min (19840
 5000 metres – 13:17.37 min (1984)
 10,000 metres – 28:24.89 min (1988)

References

External links

Living people
1956 births
Athletes from Saint Petersburg
Soviet male long-distance runners
Russian male long-distance runners
World Athletics Championships athletes for the Soviet Union
Friendship Games medalists in athletics